Karl Markt (born 8 March 1980) is an Austrian cross-country mountain biker. At the 2012 Summer Olympics, he competed in the Men's cross-country at Hadleigh Farm, finishing in 20th place.

References

Austrian male cyclists
Cross-country mountain bikers
Living people
Olympic cyclists of Austria
Cyclists at the 2012 Summer Olympics
1980 births
Austrian mountain bikers
People from Zams
Sportspeople from Tyrol (state)
21st-century Austrian people